Maja is a mountain peak found in  Kosovo.

Notes and references
Notes:

References:

Mountains of Kosovo
International mountains of Europe